Wooton is an unincorporated community located in Leslie County, Kentucky, United States.

Wooton was home to the first Works Progress Administration (WPA) pack horse library in Kentucky in 1934. The library was located in the Wooton Community Center.

References

Unincorporated communities in Leslie County, Kentucky
Unincorporated communities in Kentucky